Aerosvet was an aviation magazine published by the Aeronautical Union of Vojvodina, Yugoslavia. The magazine was started in 1985 and published on a bimonthly basis. It was successor of another Yugoslavian aviation magazine with the same name that existed during the 1950s and published in Belgrade.

Aerosvet had an English-language sister publication, Aerosvet International, that was published four times annually.

See also
 Yugoslav Air Force
 Glasnik RV i PVO
 Krila Armije

References

1985 establishments in Yugoslavia
Aviation magazines
Bi-monthly magazines
Defunct magazines published in Yugoslavia
Magazines established in 1985
Magazines disestablished in 1991
Mass media in Novi Sad
Serbian-language magazines